Vsetín is a town in the Zlín Region of the Czech Republic. It has about 25,000 inhabitants.
 
Originally a small town, Vsetín has become an important centre of industrial, economic, cultural and sports life during the 20th century.

Administrative parts
Villages of Horní Jasenka and Rokytnice are administrative parts of Vsetín.

Etymology
The name Vsetín was derived from the personal Slavic name Vsata, Seta, Sěntoslav or Svatoslav. It was probably the name of a man who was tasked with deforesting the area and establishing the first fields. The first name used was Setteinz, the name Wssetin was used since 1396.

Geography

The town lies in the valley of the Vsetínská Bečva river. The village of Rokytnice lies on the small river of Rokytenka, which flows into the Vsetínská Bečva in the centre of the town. Overall, the landscape is rich in small watercourses.

Vsetín is situated in the Hostýn-Vsetín Mountains within the Western Carpathians.

History

14th–16th centuries
The first written mention of the area around the Bečva river is from 1297, when Vsetín did not yet exist. The first written mention of Vsetín is from 1308, when it was owned by Knights Templar who rented it to Lord Vok of Kravaře. It was described as a small town with a church, a mill and the Freudsberg Castle, and further colonization of the area was described. In following decades, Vsetín was held by many noble families. The most significant were lords of Cimburk, lords of Svätý Jur and Pezinok, lords Kunštát, lords of Šelmberk, and the Pernštejn family. A fortress was built in what is today the Horní Square in the first half of the 15th century.

17th–18th centuries

In 1609, Vsetín was acquired by marriage by Albrecht von Wallenstein. He brought Jesuits to the Vsetín dominion and initiated a strict re-Catholicisation among serfs. Religious and economic oppression led to resistance and long-term rebellions of the serfs during the Thirty Years' War. The serfs joined the Swedish army in the war and Vsetín became their centre. In 1627, Vsetín was burned down and many people were executed, but the rebels weren't defeated until 1644. About 200 participants of the rebellion were executed in Vsetín and it remains one of the most dreadful in the nation's history. Vsetín and villages in a wide surrounding area were burned.

During the Thirty Years' War, Vsetín extended from the original so-called Upper Town to the pastures spread out on the left bank of the Bečva river, where a manor mill already stood since the 15th century. Families of refugees from surrounding towns, mainly from Valašské Meziříčí, dramatically affected by war, settled there and founded a settlement called Lower Town. In 1647, Lower Town became an autonomous municipality, having only the advocatus in common with the current Vsetín. The Upper and Lower Towns often argued about things like taxes, land and markets.

Between 1663 and 1683, Vsetín was devastated by the Turkish and Tartarish raids, followed by Hungarian rebels. In 1708 the town was most affected as Hungarian rebels burned it almost to the ground, including the castle. It took decades for Vsetín to recover from that damage.

In 1653 Vsetín became the property of a Hungarian noble family, the Counts of Illésházy, who owned it for almost 180 years and had the most profound impact on its development. During the era of Jan of Illésházy in the second half of the 18th century, bloody rebellions of the Protestants repeated. It was not until the Patent of Toleration issued in 1781 when the situation cooled down.

19th century

In 1849, the Upper and Lower Towns merged. In the first half of 19th century, Vsetín and the surrounding area were influenced by the Industrial Revolution, bringing into use the vast stock of wood in the surrounding beech and fir forests. A sugar factory, a steam saw mill, a factory producing matches and a glassworks were founded in 1868 and were the first factories in Vsetín. In the late 19th century, Vsetín became an important centre of industrial production of bent-wood furniture in the factories of Jacob & Josef Kohn and Gebrüder Thonet, which belonged to the top companies of the world for this type of furniture.

In 1885 the town was linked to an inland railway system, followed by the construction of schools, a hospital, a power plant, water mains and other public facilities. Tomáš Garrigue Masaryk, who was a representative of East Moravian towns in the Imperial Council at that time, also contributed to the construction of some of these constructions.

20th century

In 1909, Vsetín became a district town and its importance grew in parallel with its economic boom. The furniture industry declined during the world economic crisis in the 1930s, followed by the limitation of production in other industrial companies. That situation resulted in a high level of unemployment in the area. This changed in 1937 with the construction of a new factory of the firearm producer Zbrojovka Brno. However, at that time Vsetín was already known for its production of electric engines in the Josef Sousedík factory.

During World War II, mainly due to military production, the number of inhabitants doubled, reaching 14,000. New inhabitants were mainly represented by employees from Zbrojovka who came from Brno. During the war, several resistance groups were successively established, out of which J. Sousedík was one of the most significant. Its members initiated collaboration with the Clay group connected with the exiled government in London and later with the 1st Czechoslovak Partisan Brigade of Jan Žižka which crossed the Moravian border at times of the Slovak National Uprising. Vsetín was liberated on 4 May 1945 by forces of the 1st Czechoslovak Army led by General Karel Klapálek.

Post-war development of the town was influenced for many years by its fast growth during the war. The town experienced a considerable shortage of flats, shops, school premises and medical centres. Its orientation on the development of heavy industry and military production resulted in the closing down of a series of smaller industrial companies. In connection with communist political development after February 1948, private trade successively declined.
 
The problems connected with the growth of the town are reflected mainly in the area of the construction of housing estates and the school system. The 1960 initiation of massive construction of panel housing estates in the outlying parts of the town only represented a partial solution to the problem. Between 1960 and 1990 the number of inhabitants in the town almost doubled. The peak was reached in 1991, when Vsetín had almost 30,000 inhabitants.

After the fall of communism in 1989, many of the large previously state-owned factories in Vsetín ran into difficulties as they struggled to compete as part of the wider European economy. These outdated industries were largely split up to form smaller, more efficient, new private companies, or were bought by foreign investors who were able to provide the capital necessary to modernise production. Although this resulted in high levels of unemployment never seen under communism, a gradual recovery took place during the following decades.

Demographics

Economy
Vsetín is an industrial town with several large companies. The largest industrial employer based in the town is Kayaku Safety Systems Europe (part of the Nippon Kayaku Group), producer of safety systems for automotive industry.

Other significant industrial companies are Austin Detonator (part of Austin Powder Company), one of the largest world manufacturers of detonators founded in 1953 in the premises of the former Zbrojovka factory, and WOCO STV, manufacturer of parts for the automotive industry founded in 1956.

Transport

Vsetín lies on the railway line of regional  importance to Přerov, and on railway lines of local importance to Velké Karlovice and Valašské Klobouky.

Culture
Vsetín lies in the cultural region of Moravian Wallachia. The folk culture has been kept alive by Wallachian song and dance groups for many decades.

In the summer of 1949 Wallachian towns and municipalities organized an important local exhibition called Wallachia at Work. Since 1999 that exhibition has been commemorated by organizing a week-long multi-genre festival called Valašské záření ("Wallachian Shining").

Sport
The town is home to VHK Vsetín, throughout the 1990s the most successful ice hockey team in the country, winning the National League six times. However, as of 2020, the VHK Vsetín plays in the second tier of Czech ice hockey competition.

Sights

The historical centre is formed by Horní Square and its surroundings. On the square is located several monuments, including Vsetín Castle, Old Town Hall and New Town Hall.

The Vsetín Castle with its high tower is the main landmark of the town and the oldest historical building. The Renaissance castle was built between 1600 and 1610 on the site of the old fortress. In 1708, it was destroyed by a fire and was rebuilt several times. The current Neoclassical appearance of the castle is from the reconstruction in 1833–1834. In the 20th century, the castle served as the seat of various institutions and was damaged. After repairs, it was opened to the public in 1975 and still serves as a major regional cultural and social centre. It houses the Regional Museum of Moravian Wallachia, which was founded in 1924.

The Old Town Hall was built in 1720–1721. It was rebuilt in 1850 and the tower was added. Today the house serves as a gallery and ceremonial hall. The New Town Hall was built in the Neorenaissance style in 1898–1899 and today houses a hotel.

The Church of the Assumption of the Virgin Mary is an atypical Baroque church building from the end of the 17th century. It was originally built as a castle for Count Jiří Illésházy, who dedicated the unfinished construction to the Catholic Church, after the old wooden church was burned down in 1683. It was consecrated in 1689. During alterations in the 19th century, the church tower was finished with an onion-shaped dome with three new bells.

Notable people

Josef Sousedík (1894–1944), inventor, industrialist and resistance fighter
Jarmila Šuláková (1929–2017), folk singer
Miroslav Tetter (1938–2021), politician and academic
Eliška Balzerová (born 1949), actress
Mirek Topolánek (born 1956), former Prime Minister and President of the European Council
Roman Vojtek (born 1972), actor
Václav Varaďa (born 1976), ice hockey player
Roman Hubník (born 1984), footballer

Twin towns – sister cities

Vsetín is twinned with:
 Bytom, Poland
 Mödling, Austria
 Stará Ľubovňa, Slovakia
 Trenčianske Teplice, Slovakia
 Vrgorac, Croatia

References

External links

Old pictures and photos of Vsetin
Vsetin weather & climate

Populated places in Vsetín District
Cities and towns in the Czech Republic
Moravian Wallachia